"Passionate Kisses" is a song written and performed by American singer-songwriter Lucinda Williams. It was released in 1989 as the fourth single from her third album, Lucinda Williams (1988).

The song was famously covered by Mary Chapin Carpenter for her 1992 album Come On Come On, and released as the album's third single.

Critical reception
Robin Denselow, writing in The Guardian, called the song a "rousing country rocker." Country music website The Boot ranked "Passionate Kisses" No. 1 on their list of the best Lucinda Williams songs, describing it as "a modern-day feminist anthem about having it all — a comfortable bed, food, a rock band and passionate kisses." The lyrics document "I shout it out to the night, give me what I deserve 'cause it's my right."

In 2021, "Passionate Kisses" ranked No. 437 on Rolling Stone's 500 Greatest Songs of All Time.

Track listing
CD single
 "Passionate Kisses" – 2:35
 "Nothing In Rambling" – 4:45
 "Disgusted" – 3:09	
 "Goin' Back Home" – 3:22	
 "Side Of The Road" – 3:27

Mary Chapin Carpenter version
Released in January 1993, "Passionate Kisses" was the third single from Carpenter's fourth album Come On Come On. The song reached No. 4 on the Billboard Hot Country Singles & Tracks chart in March 1993, and No. 54 on the Billboard Hot 100. Carpenter's version adheres closely in tempo, feel, and instrumentation to Williams' original recording, similarly relying on the catchy guitar riff to anchor the record. The recording enhanced Carpenter's crossover appeal and earned her the Grammy Award for Best Female Country Vocal Performance in 1994, in addition to securing the Grammy Award for Best Country Song for Williams.

Track listing
CD single
 "Passionate Kisses" – 3:23
 "Downtown Train" – 4:11
 "The Bug" – 3:48
 "Quittin' Time" – 3:52

Music videos
Williams and Carpenter each released music videos for their recordings. Williams' original music video was released in August 1989. 

Carpenter's music video was directed by Markus Blunder and premiered in early 1993. It was filmed in Washington, D.C.

Chart performance

Williams version

Carpenter version

Year-end charts

Awards

References

External links
Lucinda Williams Official Website
Mary Chapin Carpenter Official Website

Songs about kissing
Lucinda Williams songs
Mary Chapin Carpenter songs
1989 singles
1993 singles
Songs written by Lucinda Williams
Rough Trade Records singles
Columbia Records singles
1988 songs